Pedicularis is a genus of perennial green root parasite plants currently placed in the family Orobanchaceae (the genus previously having been placed in Scrophulariaceae sensu lato).

Description
Between 350 and 600 species are accepted by different authorities, mostly from the wetter northern temperate zones, as well as from South America. The highest diversity is in eastern Asia, with 352 species accepted in China alone.

Taxonomy
The common name lousewort, applied to several species, derives from an old belief that these plants, when ingested, were responsible for lice infestations in livestock. The genus name Pedicularis is from the Latin pediculus meaning louse.

Selected species 

Pedicularis acaulis
Pedicularis amoena
Pedicularis arguteserrata
Pedicularis ascendens
Pedicularis asparagoides
Pedicularis asplenifolia
Pedicularis attollens (little elephant's head)
Pedicularis baumgartenii
Pedicularis bhutanomuscoides
Pedicularis brachyodonta
Pedicularis bracteosa (fern-leaf, towering, or bracted lousewort)
Pedicularis cacuminidenta
Pedicularis canadensis (Canadian lousewort)
Pedicularis centranthera
Pedicularis comosa
Pedicularis compacta
Pedicularis contorta (coiled lousewort or white-coiled beak lousewort)
Pedicularis dasyantha (woolly lousewort)
Pedicularis dasystachys
Pedicularis densiflora (Indian warrior)
Pedicularis dhurensis
Pedicularis dudleyi (Dudley's lousewort)
Pedicularis elegans
Pedicularis elephantiflora
Pedicularis elongata
Pedicularis exaltata
Pedicularis ferdinandi
Pedicularis flammea (redrattle)
Pedicularis foliosa (leafy lousewort)
Pedicularis furbishiae (Furbish's lousewort)
Pedicularis friderici-augusti
Pedicularis graeca
Pedicularis groenlandica (elephant's head)
Pedicularis gyroflexa
Pedicularis hacquetii
Pedicularis heterodonta
Pedicularis hirsuta (hairy lousewort)
Pedicularis howellii (Howell's lousewort)
Pedicularis julica
Pedicularis kaufmannii
Pedicularis kerneri
Pedicularis labradorica
Pedicularis lanata
Pedicularis lanceolata
Pedicularis langsdorfii
Pedicularis lapponica (Lapland lousewort)
Pedicularis leucodon
Pedicularis limnogena
Pedicularis mixta
Pedicularis oederi (crimson-tipped lousewort)
Pedicularis ornithorhyncha (duck's-bill/bird's-beak lousewort)
Pedicularis orthantha
Pedicularis oxycarpa
Pedicularis palustris (marsh lousewort)
Pedicularis parryi (Parry's lousewort)
Pedicularis pectinata
Pedicularis petiolaris
Pedicularis physocalyx
Pedicularis portenschlagii
Pedicularis procera (giant lousewort)
Pedicularis pyrenaica
Pedicularis racemosa (sickle-top lousewort, parrot's beak)
Pedicularis rainierensis (Mount Rainier lousewort)
Pedicularis recutita
Pedicularis resupinata
Pedicularis rex
Pedicularis rosea
Pedicularis rostratocapitata
Pedicularis rostratospicata
Pedicularis sceptrum-carolinum (Moor-king lousewort)
Pedicularis schizocalyx
Pedicularis semibarbata (pinewoods lousewort)
Pedicularis sibthorpii
Pedicularis sudetica (fernweed, Sudeten lousewort or Sedetic lousewort)
Pedicularis sylvatica (common lousewort)
Pedicularis tuberosa
Pedicularis uralensis
Pedicularis verticillata (verticillate lousewort)

Pollination
Bombus polaris has an essential role in the pollination of the large zygomorphic flowers of Pedicularis. B. polaris has a special adaption that allows it to work the spikes of Pedicularis from the bottom towards the top.

References

Flora Europaea: Pedicularis

 
Orobanchaceae genera
Parasitic plants
Taxa named by Carl Linnaeus